State Route 133 (SR 133) is part of Maine's system of numbered state highways, running from U.S. Route 202 (US 202), SR 11, and SR 100 in Winthrop to US 2 and SR 4 in Farmington. The first two miles of the route runs concurrently with SR 41.

Route description
SR 133 (and SR 41) begins at the interchange with US 202/SR 11/SR 100 in Winthrop. After splitting from SR 41 in Winthrop, the road heads west towards Wayne, where it meets the eastern end of SR 219. After the SR 219 junction, it heads north to the northern end of SR 106 at Livermore Falls. After passing SR 106, SR 133 keeps going north to SR 17 in Livermore Falls. SR 17 marks the second time where SR 133 has a concurrency with another state highway. Upon leaving SR 17 in Livermore Falls, it heads north towards SR 156 in Jay. SR 133 ends at Farmington at the junction with US 2 and SR 4 after passing SR 156 in Jay.

Major junctions

References

External links

Maine State Route Log via floodgap.com

133
Transportation in Kennebec County, Maine
Transportation in Androscoggin County, Maine
Transportation in Franklin County, Maine